Ustani, bane (lit. Rise, ban) is a Croatian patriotic song. It was written at the turn of the 20th century by Ognjeslav Utješinović Ostrožinski.

Lyrics

References

Croatian patriotic songs
Year of song unknown
Songwriter unknown